Glioma 261 (GL261) is a frequently used murine glioma model. It was induced via intracranial injection of methylcholanthrene followed by serial intracranial and subcutaneous transplantations of tumor fragments into syngeneic C57BL/6 mice. By the mid-1990s, multiple groups had established a permanent cell line from the tumor.

GL261 tumors resemble ependymoblastomas on histology but show many characteristics of glioblastoma phenotypes. They contain activating mutations of the K-ras as well as mutations of p53, resulting in high expression of c-myc. GL261 tumors also highly express MHC I, explaining their partial immunogenicity and have limited expression of MHC II, B7-1, and B7-2. The tumors are invasive, are not known to be metastatic, and do not spontaneously regress.

Other immunocompetent murine models used to study GBM include GL26, CT-2A, SMA-560, and 4C8.

References

External links
 Cellosaurus entry for GL261
 DCTD/DTP Tumor Repository at the NCI

Rodent cell lines